Villi may refer to:

Plural of Villus (disambiguation)
Le Villi, an opera-ballet of 1884 by Giacomo Puccini
Ilkka Villi (born 1975), Finnish actor and writer
Villi Bossi (born 1939), Italian sculptor
Villi Hermann (born 1941), Swiss film director and screenwriter
Villi Baltins, Soviet sprint canoer
Olga Villi (1922–1989), Italian model and actress
 Villi Boskovsky, an Austrian violinist
 Villi Tokarev,  a Russian-American singer-songwriter

See also
 Vili (disambiguation)